Nickelodeon is an Italian children’s television channel launched on 1 November 2004 on Sky Italia.
From 1997 until 2000, Rai Sat 2 broadcast Nickelodeon cartoons for three hours a day.

History
The channel was launched on 1 November 2004. At first it divided its frequency with Comedy Central, which broadcast at night. On 31 July 2009 a +1 timeshift version was launched. The same day Nick Jr. was launched, replacing RaiSat YOYO, which became free and is now named Rai Yoyo. On 9 September 2013, it and the +1 version of the network converted to a 16:9 widescreen aspect ratio.

Related channels

Nick Jr. 

Nick Jr. is an Italian children’s' TV channel aimed at pre-school children, It is available on Sky Italia & was launched on 31 July 2009.

TeenNick 
TeenNick was an Italian TV channel aimed at Teens & Pre-Teens & aired a wide-variety of Nickelodeons Live-action programming it was launched in 4 December 2015, though was unsuccessful & closed after about 4 years of broadcasting on 2 May 2020, The channel was available though Sky Italia.

References

External links

Italy
Telecom Italia Media
Children's television networks
Television channels in Italy
Television channels and stations established in 2004
Italian-language television stations
2004 establishments in Italy